Christian Democratic Alliance may refer to:

 Christian Democratic Alliance (Costa Rica)
 Christian Democratic Alliance (Fiji)
 Christian Democratic Alliance (South Africa)
 Christian-Democratic Alliance (Georgia); See Elections in Georgia
 Christian Democratic People's Alliance, Romania

See also
 Christian Democratic Appeal, a Christian-democratic political party in the Netherlands